Big Bear Limited was a food company based in Leicester, England.

They owned the brands of Sugar Puffs, Paynes Poppets, XXX mints, and Fox's Confectionery.

They appeared to specialise in heritage brands that have been household names.

Big Bear was acquired by Raisio Group in 2011.

Big Bear was acquired by Valeo Foods in 2015.

References

External links

Companies based in Leicester
Food manufacturers of England